Eran Elhaik (born 1980) is an Israeli-American geneticist and bioinformatician, and an associate professor of bioinformatics at Lund University in Sweden. His research uses computational, statistical, epidemiological and mathematical approaches to fields such as complex disorders, population genetics, personalised medicine, molecular evolution, genomics, paleogenomics and epigenetics.

Career
After completing undergraduate studies in Israel, he obtained a PhD in molecular evolution under the supervision of Dan Graur at the University of Houston in 2009, followed by postdoctoral research fellowships at the Johns Hopkins University School of Medicine and School of Public Health. In 2011 the Genographic Project, after concerns emerged about the retention of private genetic data of individuals in surveyed populations, hired Elhaik and asked him to design a method that would enable analysts to extract only historical information from the accumulating genomic evidence of populations in such a way that individual's right to keep their private health profile was collected from individuals, without infringing their personal health data private.'  From 2014 to 2019 he worked at the University of Sheffield Department of Animal and Plant Sciences in the United Kingdom. Since 2019 he has been an associate professor of bioinformatics at the Department of Biology at Lund University in Sweden.

Research
In the field of molecular evolution, Elhaik worked on the compositional domain model that describes the compositional organization of animal genomes.

In the field of complex disorders, he proposed that the allostatic load theory could be used to explain bipolar disorder 
and Sudden infant death syndrome (SIDS). According to this theory, the accumulation of perinatal and prenatal stressors has neurotoxic effects with consequences to one's health.

In the field of genetics, Elhaik was part of the team that designed the GenoChip microarray for the Genographic Project and their online tests. He also contributed to the development of algorithms for data compression. in earlier ancestry studies, modern paternal or maternal haplogroups were  used to trace migrations in antiquity. Elhaik was diffident about the method, considereding it problematic 'since the modern frequencies of haplogroups do not represent the past very accurately.' To this end he developed his aGPS algorithm to establish place of origin with greater precision.

In the field of population genetics, Elhaik has published papers analyzing the ancestries of European Jews and Druze, including work related to the  Khazar hypothesis of Ashkenazi ancestry, a contentious subject that has received media attention. Elhaik argues for a non-Levantine origin of the Ashkenazi and favours the hypothesis that they are of mixed Irano-Turko-Slavic and southern European descent. Most of Elhaik's population genetic research uses the GPS (Geographic Population Structure) algorithm designed by him and co-authors.

Elhaik himself initially contacted Harry Ostrer, who, along with most other scientists in the field, proposes that the Jews are genetically related and relatively homogeneous, in order to obtain permission to access the data basis used by Ostrer and his colleagues to establish their result. Ostrer was willing to share his data provided that Elhaik submit a proposal showing that the project met several criteria, including that it be "non-defamatory nature toward the Jewish people", which Elhaik viewed as evidence of bias and which pediatrician Catherine DeAngelis called "peculiar".

Elhaik has said that while his paper "has attracted the attention of anti-Zionists and 'anti-Semitic white supremacists'", his intention was not to disprove a connection to biblical Jews, but rather "to eliminate the racist underpinnings of anti-Semitism in Europe".

In the field of paleogenetics, Elhaik has published papers that identified ancient ancestry informative markers (aAIMs), which can be used for the biolocalization of ancient individuals  He has also developed an AI-based method called Temporal Population Structure (TPS) to date ancient individuals from their DNA without prior knowledge.

In terms of pure theory, Elhaik has published a critique of the methodology  of PCA that undergirds the whole structure of population genetics. Re-analyzing 12 PCA applications he found that the method lends itself to generating desired outcomes, and is characterized by cherrypicking and circular reasoning. The design flexibility of PCA enables anyone to buttress preconceived claims about ethnogenesis.  He illustrated the point by instancing the case of genetic studies of the origins of Ashkenazi Jews. Of some  21, 840 papers published by Nature Portfolio in 2022, this paper was ranked among the top 100 downloaded scientific papers for that year.

Reactions
The accuracy and reliability of Elhaik's population genetic theory of the Khazars met with strong criticism from a number of other geneticists, as well as from linguists who took exception to his use of Paul Wexler's theories of Yiddish.

In particular the validity of the proxy population used in his first Khazar paper was criticized on methodological grounds.
Marcus Feldman has said that Elhaik is "just wrong" with regard to the Khazar hypothesis where, in Feldman's view, he "appears to be applying the statistics in a way that gives him different results from what everybody else has obtained from essentially similar data". Elhaik argues that ancestry of Jewish populations is poorly understood, and also that principal component analysis, employed to identify population structures and their ancestry, has serious flaws that generate erroneous results.

In a 2015 overview of the issue of attempts to derive an inclusive genetic profile of all Jews, Raphael Falk, touching on Elhaik's contribution to the argument in 2013, wrote:
The findings support the hypothesis that posits that European Jews are  Caucasus, European, and Middle Eastern ancestries, and portray the European Jewish genome as a mosaic of Caucasus, European, and Semitic ancestries, thereby consolidating previous contradictory reports of Jewish ancestry.
Falk then noted the follow-up paper by Behar challenging Elhaik's results argued that the southern Caucasus populations, sampled by Elhaik were related to countries further south. The problem, he concluded, was that 'the risk of circularity of the argument is exposed: Geneticist determine the genotypic details of socio-ethnologists' classifications, whereas socio-demographers rely on geneticists findings to bolster their classifications.'

References

External links

1980 births
Living people
Israeli geneticists
American bioinformaticians
Academics of the University of Sheffield
University of Houston alumni
Israeli emigrants to the United States